Lysinibacillus yapensis is a Gram-positive, aerobic, spore-forming and motile bacterium from the genus of Lysinibacillus which has been isolated from deep-sea sediments from the Yap Trench.

References

Bacillaceae
Bacteria described in 2020